The Republican Majority Issues Committee (RMIC), a tax-exempt 527 committee, organized as a corporation under the laws of Virginia with its principal office located in Virginia, was created by and through the fundraising efforts of Ed Buckham, the founder of Alexander Strategy Group.  Karl Gallant ran RMIC and served as its registered agent.

References

External links
Robert Dreyfuss, "DeLay, Incorporated," The Texas Observer, February 4, 2000.
RICO Law Suit: Democratic Congressional Campaign Committee, Inc. vs Tom DeLay, U.S. Family Network, Inc. (William J. Olson), Republican Majority Issues Committee, Inc. (Karl Gallant), Americans for Economic Growth, Inc. (Jim Ellis), and Does 1-20, filed in United States District Court for the District of Columbia, May 3, 2000.

527 organizations
Organizations based in Virginia